Nyaung-U Township is a township of Nyaung-U District in the Mandalay Division of Burma. Its administrative town is Nyaung-U.

Notes

Townships of Mandalay Region